The Old Vero Beach Community Building (also known as the Vero Beach Service Center, Vero Beach Physical Arts Center, or Heritage Center) is a historic building in Vero Beach, Florida. Located at 2146 14th Avenue, the Vero Beach Community Building was built in 1935 during the New Deal Era, a project that provided residents and visitors alike with social and entertainment activities during the great depression. The building served as a social gathering place, playhouse, and meeting hall as well as the Headquarters for the Tourist Club. The Community Building once hosted a zoo that consisted of a bear named "Alice", an alligator, monkeys and other animals. The site of the zoo is now occupied by Pocahantas Park. In 1943 a north wing was added to the building in order for it to become a servingmen's club. Organized by director Dale Wimbrow, the addition consisted of lounge, a restroom, and showers. After World War II, the 1943 addition became the Indian River Citrus Museum. On January 19, 1993, it was added to the U.S. National Register of Historic Places.

References

External links

 Indian River County listings at National Register of Historic Places
 Indian River County listings at Florida's Office of Cultural and Historical Programs

National Register of Historic Places in Indian River County, Florida
Buildings and structures in Vero Beach, Florida
Buildings and structures completed in 1935
1935 establishments in Florida